At least two ships of the Argentine Navy have been named Robinson:

 , a  commissioned in 1939 and decommissioned in 1967.
 , an  launched in 1984.

Argentine Navy ship names